Dairyland may refer to:
Dairyland, California (disambiguation), multiple places
Dairyland, Wisconsin, a town
Dairyland (community), Wisconsin, an unincorporated community
Dairyland Canada, a division of Saputo
Dairyland Insurance, a United States insurance company